Responsio ad Lutherum is a book written in Latin in 1523 by Thomas More, asked for by Henry VIII of England, against the teachings of Martin Luther. It was a response to Luther's 1522 tract Against Henry, King of the English which was itself a reaction to Henry's 1521 treatise Defence of the Seven Sacraments.

It was More's first major theological work.

References

External links
English translation of Responsio ad Lutherum

1523 books
1523 in England
Books by Thomas More
Henry VIII
Martin Luther
16th-century Latin books